Dammarie-en-Puisaye is a commune in the Loiret department in north-central France, in the historical region of Puisaye.

See also
Communes of the Loiret department

References

Dammarieenpuisaye